Éamon Rooney (died 9 November 1993) was an Irish Fine Gael politician who served as a member of the Oireachtas for twenty-one years.

Rooney first stood for election to Dáil Éireann at a by-election on 29 October 1947 for the Dublin County constituency, following the death of the Fianna Fáil Teachta Dála (TD) Patrick Fogarty. He was unsuccessful on that occasion, losing to the Clann na Poblachta candidate Seán MacBride, but was elected the following year at the 1948 general election, taking his seat in the 13th Dáil.

He was re-elected at the next four general elections, before losing his seat at the 1965 general election to Fianna Fáil's Des Foley, a 25-year-old gaelic football and hurling star. Rooney was then elected to the 11th Seanad by the Administrative Panel, where he sat until 1969. He stood again as a Dáil candidate at the 1969 general election, but lost again and retired from politics.

References

Year of birth missing
1993 deaths
Fine Gael TDs
Members of the 13th Dáil
Members of the 14th Dáil
Members of the 15th Dáil
Members of the 16th Dáil
Members of the 17th Dáil
Members of the 11th Seanad
Fine Gael senators